A View from the Eiffel tower (Serbian: Pogled sa Ajfelovog tornja) is a 2005 Montenegrin drama film directed by Nikola Vukčević and starring Branislav Trifunović, Marija Vicković, and Darko Rundek.

Plot
The main character Marijana is a beautiful 25-year-old girl.  When she was 16 her father's boss sexually abused her. Marijana's father progressed his career (as a gynaecologist willing to perform illegal abortions) due to his boss's assistance and did nothing about the abuse.

Ten years later, Marijana seeks to avenge what was done to her by becoming a prostitute, sleeping with her father's colleagues and harming his reputation. She falls in love with a poor sculptor named Vanja, but struggles to reconcile her love with prostitution.

Cast
 Branislav Trifunović
 Lena Bogdanović
 Petar Božović
 Svetozar Cvetković
 Varja Ðukić
 Igor Lazić
 Irfan Mensur
 Andrija Milošević
 Dragana Mrkić
 Darko Rundek
 Sergej Trifunović
 Marija Vicković
 Dubravka Vukotić

External links
 

2005 films
Montenegrin drama films
Films shot in Montenegro
2005 drama films
Serbian-language films
Montenegrin-language films
Films set in Montenegro
2000s English-language films